The Cádiz Public Library is a public library located in Cádiz, Spain.

See also 
 List of libraries in Spain

References

External links 
 Cádiz Public Library

Buildings and structures in Cádiz
Libraries in Andalusia
Public libraries in Spain